Gathering of Freaks is the second album from the Heavy Metal band Freak of Nature, fronted by former White Lion lead singer Mike Tramp, released in 1994.

Overview
The album spent one week at #66 on the UK Albums Chart in October 1994. It was the band's only UK chart presence. The album was recorded in Canoga Park, California, and North Hollywood, California with producer Phil Kaffel. All songs were written by the band with lyrics provided by Mike Tramp.

Following the release of the album guitarist Kenny Korade was replaced by Marcus Nand and the band undertook another tour in support of the album.

The promo single "Enemy" featured a music video.

Track listing
 "The Gathering"
 "Enemy"
 "Stand Back"
 "Raping the Cradle"
 "Big Black Hole"
 "The Tree"
 "Candle"
 "Need"
 "Open Space"
 "Get It Yourself"
 "Powerless"
 "The Parting"

Personnel
 Mike Tramp – vocals
 Dennis Chick – lead guitar
 Kenny Korade – rhythm guitar
 Jerry Best – bass guitar
 Johnny Haro – drums

Touring Members
 Marcus Nand – rhythm guitar

Charts

References

1994 albums
Freak of Nature (band) albums
Music for Nations albums